Aphytis is a genus of chalcid wasp in the Aphelinidae family. Members of this genus are very small averaging two to three millimetres in length and are mostly black or yellow with transparent wings. The larvae are parasitic on other insects. There are about 130 species.

Species

Aphytis aberrans  Prinsloo & Neser, 1994
Aphytis abnormis  Howard, 1881
Aphytis acalcaratus  Ren Hui, 1988
Aphytis acrenulatus  DeBach & Rosen, 1976
Aphytis acutaspidis  Rosen & DeBach, 1979
Aphytis africanus  Quednau, 1964
Aphytis alami  Agarwal, 1964
Aphytis albus  Li & Yang, 2004
Aphytis aligarhensis  Hayat, 1998
Aphytis amazonensis  Rosen & DeBach, 1979
Aphytis angeloni  Alec Arsène Girault, 1932
Aphytis angustus  Compere, 1955
Aphytis anneckei  DeBach & Rosen, 1976
Aphytis anomalus  Compere, 1955
Aphytis antennalis  Rosen & DeBach, 1979
Aphytis aonidiae  Mercet, 1911
Aphytis argenticorpus  Rosen & DeBach, 1979
Aphytis australiensis  DeBach & Rosen, 1976
Aphytis azai  Abd-Rabou, 2004
Aphytis bangalorensis   Rosen & DeBach, 1986
Aphytis bedfordi   Rosen & DeBach, 1979
Aphytis benassyi   Fabres, 1978
Aphytis breviclavatus  Huang, 1994
Aphytis capensis  DeBach & Rosen, 1976
Aphytis capillatus  Howard, 1907
Aphytis caucasicus  Chumakova, 1964
Aphytis cercinus  Compere, 1955
Aphytis chilensis  Howard, 1900
Aphytis chionaspis  Ren Hui, 1988
Aphytis chrysomphali  Mercet, 1912
Aphytis ciliatus  Dodd, 1917
Aphytis cochereaui  DeBach & Rosen 1976
Aphytis coheni  DeBach, 1960
Aphytis columbi  Alec Arsène Girault, 1932
Aphytis comperei  DeBach & Rosen, 1976
Aphytis confusus  DeBach & Rosen, 1976
Aphytis cornuaspis  Huang, 1994
Aphytis costalimai  Gomes 1942
Aphytis cylindratus  Compere, 1955
Aphytis dealbatus  Compere, 1955
Aphytis debachi  Azim, 1963
Aphytis densiciliatus  Huang, 1994
Aphytis desantisi  DeBach & Rosen, 1976
Aphytis diaspidis  Howard, 1881
Aphytis elongatus  Huang, 1994
Aphytis equatorialis  Rosen & DeBach, 1979
Aphytis erythraeus  Silvestri, 1915
Aphytis fabresi  DeBach & Rosen, 1976
Aphytis faurei  Annecke, 1964
Aphytis fioriniae  Rosen & Rose, 1989
Aphytis fisheri  DeBach, 1959
Aphytis funicularis  Compere, 1955
Aphytis gordoni  DeBach & Rosen, 1976
Aphytis griseus  Quednau, 1964
Aphytis haywardi  De Santis, 1948
Aphytis hispanicus  Mercet, 1912
Aphytis holoxanthus  DeBach, 1960
Aphytis huidongensis  Huang, 1994
Aphytis hyalinipennis  Rosen & DeBach, 1979
Aphytis ignotus  Compere, 1955
Aphytis immaculatus  Compere, 1955
Aphytis japonicus  DeBach & Azim, 1962
Aphytis keatsi  Alec Arsène Girault, 1919
Aphytis landii  Rosen & DeBach, 1986
Aphytis lepidosaphes  Compere, 1955
Aphytis liangi  Huang, 1994
Aphytis libanicus  Traboulsi, 1969
Aphytis limonus  Rust, 1915
Aphytis lindingaspis  Huang, 1994
Aphytis lingnanensis  Compere, 1955
Aphytis longicaudus   Rosen & DeBach, 1979
Aphytis luteus  Ratzeburg, 1852
Aphytis maculatipennis  Dozier, 1933
Aphytis maculatipes  Alec Arsène Girault, 1917
Aphytis maculatus  Shafee, 1970
Aphytis maculicornis  Masi, 1911
Aphytis mandalayensis  Rosen & DeBach, 1979
Aphytis manii  Hayat, 1998
Aphytis margaretae  DeBach & Rosen, 1976
Aphytis mashae  Myartseva, 2004
Aphytis matruhi  Abd-Rabou, 2004
Aphytis mazalae  DeBach & Rosen, 1976
Aphytis melanostictus  Compere, 1955
Aphytis melinus  DeBach, 1959
Aphytis merceti  Compere, 1955
Aphytis mimosae  DeBach & Rosen, 1976
Aphytis minutissimus  Alec Arsène Girault, 1913
Aphytis moldavicus  Yasnosh, 1966
Aphytis mytilaspidis  Le Baron, 1870
Aphytis neuter  Yasnosh & Myartseva, 1971
Aphytis newtoni  Alec Arsène Girault, 1913
Aphytis nigripes  Compere, 1936
Aphytis notialis  de Santis, 1965
Aphytis noumeaensis  Howard, 1907
Aphytis obscurus  DeBach & Rosen, 1976
Aphytis opuntiae  Mercet, 1912
Aphytis paramaculicornis   DeBach & Rosen, 1976
Aphytis peculiaris  Alec Arsène Girault, 1932
Aphytis perissoptroides  Alec Arsène Girault, 1915
Aphytis perplexus  Rosen & DeBach, 1979
Aphytis philippinensis  DeBach & Rosen, 1976
Aphytis phoenicis  DeBach & Rosen, 1976
Aphytis pilosus  DeBach & Rosen, 1976
Aphytis pinnaspidis  Rosen & DeBach, 1979
Aphytis proclia  Walker, 1839
Aphytis punctaticorpus  Alec Arsène Girault, 1917
Aphytis quadraspidioti  Li, 1996
Aphytis riyadhi  DeBach, 1979
Aphytis rolaspidis  DeBach & Rosen, 1976
Aphytis roseni  DeBach & Gordh, 1974
Aphytis ruskini  Alec Arsène Girault, 1915
Aphytis salvadorensis  Rosen & DeBach, 1979
Aphytis sankarani  Rosen & DeBach, 1986
Aphytis secundus  Compere, 1936
Aphytis sensorius  DeBach & Rosen, 1976
Aphytis setosus  DeBach & Rosen, 1976
Aphytis simmondsiae  DeBach, 1984
Aphytis simplex  Zehntner, 1897
Aphytis stepanovi  Yasnosh, 1995
Aphytis taylori  Quednau, 1964
Aphytis testaceus  Chumakova, 1961
Aphytis theae  Cameron, 1891
Aphytis transversus  Huang, 1994
Aphytis tucumani  Rosen & DeBach, 1979
Aphytis ulianovi  Alec Arsène Girault, 1932
Aphytis unaspidis  Rose & Rosen, 1991
Aphytis unicus  Huang, 1994 
Aphytis vandenboschi  DeBach & Rosen, 1976
Aphytis vastus  Prinsloo & Neser, 1994
Aphytis vittatus  Compere, 1925
Aphytis wallumbillae  Alec Arsène Girault, 1924
Aphytis yanonensis  DeBach & Rosen, 1982
Aphytis yasumatsui  Azim, 1963

References

Aphelinidae